Melvin Leon Stottlemyre Sr. (November 13, 1941 – January 13, 2019) was an American professional baseball pitcher and pitching coach. He played for 11 seasons in Major League Baseball, all for the New York Yankees, and coached for 23 seasons, for the Yankees, New York Mets, Houston Astros, and Seattle Mariners. He was a five-time MLB All-Star as a player and a five-time World Series champion as a coach.

Baseball career

As a player (1964–1974) 
Stottlemyre pitched in American Legion Baseball and attended Mabton High School in Mabton, Washington, and Yakima Valley Community College. A scout for the New York Yankees discovered Stottlemyre pitching for Yakima's baseball team, and signed him to a contract with no signing bonus on June 10, 1961. The Yankees assigned him to the Harlan Smokies of the Rookie-level Appalachian League. After appearing in eight games, the Yankees promoted him to the Auburn Yankees of the Class D New York–Penn League, and he appeared in seven games for Auburn.

Stottlemyre pitched to a 17–9 win–loss record and a 2.50 earned run average (ERA) with the Greensboro Yankees of the Class B Carolina League in 1962, and was promoted to the Richmond Virginians of the Class AAA International League in 1963. He alternated between starting and relieving for Richmond, before Ralph Houk, the Yankees' general manager, insisted that Stottlemyre be used exclusively as a starting pitcher. He recorded a 1.42 ERA in the 1964 season, the best in the International League.

Called up midseason in 1964, Stottlemyre went 9–3 to help the Yankees to their fifth consecutive pennant while being on the cover of The Sporting News. In the 1964 World Series, Stottlemyre faced Bob Gibson of the St. Louis Cardinals three times in the seven-game Series. Stottlemyre bested Gibson in Game 2 to even the series, and got a no-decision in Game 5, but lost the decisive Game 7 as the Cardinals won the Series.

Stottlemyre was named to the American League's (AL) roster for the 1965 Major League Baseball (MLB) All-Star Game, though he did not appear in the game. He won 20 games in the 1965 season, and led the AL with 18 complete games, 291 innings pitched, and 1,188 batters faced. He appeared in the 1966 MLB All-Star Game. He led the league with 20 losses. Stottlemyre won 20 games in the 1968 and 1969 seasons. He also started the 1969 MLB All-Star Game.

Stottlemyre threw 40 shutouts in his 11-season career, the same number as Hall of Fame lefty Sandy Koufax, which ties for 44th best all-time. Eighteen of those shutouts came in a three-season span from 1971–73.
The Yankees released Stottlemyre before the 1975 season. Stottlemyre retired with 164 career wins and a 2.97 ERA.

Known as a solid-hitting pitcher, on July 20, 1965, Stottlemyre hit a rare inside-the-park grand slam. On September 26, 1964, he recorded five base hits in five at bats.

Coaching years (1984–2008) 

In 1977, Stottlemyre re-emerged in baseball as a roving instructor for the Seattle Mariners. He spent five seasons in that position, and was hired by the New York Mets as their pitching coach in November 1983. In that role, he oversaw Dwight Gooden's National League Rookie of the Year and Cy Young Award seasons in 1984 and 1985. Stottlemyre served in the role for ten years (including the 1986 World Series championship team) and then followed that by serving a two-year stint as the Houston Astros pitching coach.

New York Yankees (1996–2005) 
In 1996, Stottlemyre joined the Yankees coaching staff along with the incoming manager Joe Torre. Under Torre, Stottlemyre lowered the team ERA from 4.65 in 1996 to 3.84 in 1997. Under Stottlemyre, the Yankee team averaged an ERA of 4.23 from 1996 to 2005. The pitching staff was regarded as a major factor in the team's dynasty years, when they won four World Series Championships in five years.

After 10 seasons, Stottlemyre resigned his coaching position on October 12, 2005, following the Yankees' defeat in the 2005 American League Division Series by the Los Angeles Angels of Anaheim. He cited personal disagreements with Yankees owner George Steinbrenner among his reasons for leaving and cited Steinbrenner's comment that, after the division series was over, he had congratulated Angels manager Mike Scioscia. Stottlemyre's response was: "My first thought was, 'What about Joe?' Joe did a hell of a job, too. To congratulate the other manager and not congratulate your own, after what he's done this year, I laughed." The Yankees replaced Stottlemyre with former Yankees pitcher Ron Guidry.

Seattle Mariners (2008) 
Stottlemyre was named pitching coach of the Seattle Mariners under manager John McLaren at the beginning of the 2008 season, and was retained by interim manager Jim Riggleman after McLaren's firing. He was dismissed after the season ended. Following the season, he retired from baseball.

Honors 
The mayor of Mabton, Washington, declared October 12, 1964, to be "Mel Stottlemyre Day". He was inducted into the Washington State American Legion Baseball Hall of Fame in 2012. At Old-Timers' Day on June 20, 2015, the Yankees dedicated a plaque in Monument Park in Stottlemyre's honor.

Personal life 
Stottlemyre was raised in the town of Mabton, Washington, located in the south-central part of the state. He resided with his wife, Jean, in Issaquah, Washington. Two of his sons, Todd and Mel Jr., followed their father by becoming major-league pitchers. His other son, Jason, died of leukemia at the age of 11.

Stottlemyre and John Harper coauthored an autobiography titled Pride and Pinstripes, published in 2007.

Stottlemyre was diagnosed with multiple myeloma in 2000. In remission for several years, he was an avid supporter of the Multiple Myeloma Research Foundation. The cancer reappeared in 2011. Stottlemyre died on January 13, 2019, at the age of 77,
of cancer. To honor Stottlemyre, the Yankees wore black armbands on their uniform during the 2019 season.

See also 
List of second-generation Major League Baseball players
List of Major League Baseball players who spent their entire career with one franchise

References

External links 

1941 births
2019 deaths
American League All-Stars
Auburn Yankees players
Baseball coaches from Missouri
Baseball players from Missouri
Deaths from cancer in Washington (state)
Deaths from multiple myeloma
Greensboro Yankees players
Harlan Smokies players
Houston Astros coaches
Major League Baseball pitchers
Major League Baseball pitching coaches
New York Mets coaches
New York Yankees coaches
New York Yankees players
People from Issaquah, Washington
People from Texas County, Missouri
Richmond Virginians (minor league) players
Seattle Mariners coaches
United States national baseball team people
Writers from Missouri